Harold Thomas McAfee (November 20, 1953 – November 22, 2008) was an American football coach. He served as head coach at Tarleton State University from 1988 to 1992. McAfee compiled a 36–18 overall record, including an 11–1 season in 1990, the first ever undefeated regular season in school history.

McAfee was an All-Southwest Conference linebacker at the University of Arkansas. He helped the Razorbacks to a 31–10 win over Georgia in the 1976 Cotton Bowl Classic, earning him the game's Defensive Most Valuable Player award. McAfee would eventually be named to the Cotton Bowl Classic Hall of Heroes for the 1970s and the Houston Chronicle All-Time Cotton Bowl Classic team.

He started his coaching career as a defensive graduate assistant at his alma mater before moving on to the high school level. He became defensive coordinator at the high school in Marlin, Texas, before moving on to his first head coaching job at Harmony Grove High School in Camden, Arkansas.

Returning to the college football in 1986, McAfee was hired as defensive coordinator by Bill Pringle at Tarleton State University. The Texans won consecutive Texas Intercollegiate Athletic Association (TIAA) championships in 1986 and 1987, finishing seasons 9–1–1 and 9–3, respectively.

In 1988, McAfee succeeded Pringle as head coach at Tarleton State and spent the next five years leading the team. TSU won two TIAA championships (1989 & 1990) and made it to the NAIA II National Quarterfinals twice (1989 & 1990) in those five years.

McAfee died on November 22, 2008 of a massive heart attack while exercising on a treadmill in Arkadelphia, Arkansas, where he lived.  He was 55 years old.

Head coaching record

College

References

1953 births
2008 deaths
American football linebackers
Arkansas Razorbacks football players
Arkansas Razorbacks football coaches
Fort Lewis Skyhawks football coaches
Tarleton State Texans football coaches
High school football coaches in Arkansas
High school football coaches in Texas
People from Arkadelphia, Arkansas